Basket Ferentino is an Italian professional basketball team based in Ferentino, Lazio. Founded in 1977, the side plays in the second division Serie A2 as of the 2015-16 season

History
Basket Ferentino was founded in 1977. At first it played the regional tournaments until 1987, when it achieved the promotion for the first time in Serie D. In 1989 recede in the Promotion League where he remained for two seasons. It returned to Serie D in 1992 and remains in this category until 1998 when it won the championship and the promotion to the Serie C2 and later in 2000 to Serie C1.

In the 2005-2006 season Ferentino was promoted in Serie B2 instead of Cagliari, During That season it won the championship and the promotion to Serie B1.

Participates to the Serie A2 Silver during the 2008-2009 season. In the 2011-2012 season Ferentino achieved the proportion to Serie A2 Basket.

Notable players

  Omar Thomas  
  Marcus Gilbert

References

External links
Official website 

Basketball teams in Italy